Arthur Rosbotham (18 February 1892–1941) was an English footballer who played in the Football League for Barrow, Southport and Stockport County.

References

1892 births
1941 deaths
English footballers
Association football forwards
English Football League players
Atherton F.C. players
Nelson F.C. players
Preston North End F.C. players
Chorley F.C. players
Arsenal F.C. players
Stockport County F.C. players
Southport F.C. players
Barrow A.F.C. players
Rossendale United F.C. players
Colwyn Bay F.C. players
Winsford United F.C. players